Nils Jakob Hoff (born 5 February 1985, in Bergen) is a former Norwegian rower.  With Kjetil Borch he won gold in the men's double sculls at the 2013 World Championships.  The pair also competed at the 2012 Summer Olympics.  Hoff competed at the 2016 Summer Olympics in the Men's Single Sculls, winning his heat.

References 

 

1985 births
Living people
Norwegian male rowers
Sportspeople from Bergen
Rowers at the 2012 Summer Olympics
Olympic rowers of Norway
World Rowing Championships medalists for Norway
Rowers at the 2016 Summer Olympics